The 1985 Men's World Team Squash Championships were held in Cairo, Egypt and took place from November 27 until December 05, 1985.

Seeds

Results

Pool 1

Pool 2

Pool 3

Pool 4

Final Group A

Final Group B

Semi-finals

Third Place Play Off

Final

References

See also 
World Team Squash Championships
World Squash Federation
World Open (squash)

World Squash Championships
Squash tournaments in Egypt
International sports competitions hosted by Egypt
Squash
Men